The 2017 Dartmouth Big Green football team represented Dartmouth College in the 2017 NCAA Division I FCS football season. The Big Green were led by head coach Buddy Teevens in his 13th straight year and 18th overall. They played their home games at Memorial Field. They were a member of the Ivy League. They finished the season 8–2 overall and 5–2 in Ivy League play to a tie for second place. Dartmouth averaged 6,642 fans per game.

Schedule
The 2017 schedule consisted of five home games, four away games, and one game against Brown at Fenway Park in Boston. The Big Green hosted Ivy League foes Yale, Columbia, Cornell, and Princeton, and traveled to Penn and Harvard.

Dartmouth's non-conference opponents were Stetson of the Pioneer Football League, Holy Cross of the Patriot League, and Sacred Heart of the Northeast Conference. Homecoming coincided with the game against Yale on October 7.

Game summaries

Stetson

#25 Holy Cross

Penn

Yale

Sacred Heart

Columbia

Harvard

Cornell

Brown

Princeton

References

Dartmouth
Dartmouth Big Green football seasons
Dartmouth Big Green football